Varig Logística S.A., operating as VarigLog, was a cargo airline, based in Jardim Aeroporto, Campo Belo, São Paulo, Brazil.

All operations were suspended on 1 February 2012 and on 27 September 2012 it was declared bankrupt.

History

Varig Cargo

In 1927, the original company Varig was founded, which primarily performed passenger transport, but also delivered mail as an additional income. In 1944, after the arrival of a sufficient number of new aircraft, several Junkers F 13 and Lockheed L-10s were converted into fully cargo ones to service the Pelotas-Porto Alegre route, and each of them had a payload of 880 kg. Freight traffic was soon launched to Curitiba, São Paulo and Rio de Janeiro. After the end of World War II, the Douglas C-47 Skytrain began to operate on this route three times a week, and on 27 January 1948, the first purely cargo C-47 entered Varig. Since 1948, Curtiss C-46 Commando freighters began to arrive. The mixed aircraft were also widely used, which could simultaneously carry passengers and cargo, for which the internal space was divided. At the same time, cargo terminals were built in Porto Alegre, Curitiba, Florianopolis, Sao Paulo and Rio de Janeiro.

In 1960, the company received its first Boeing 707s, which could operate long-haul flights at much higher speeds, and convertible ones began arriving in the second half of the decade that could carry cargo; starting in the late 1960s, the 707s, as obsolete, began to be converted into freight. In 1975, the first medium-haul Boeing 727-100F were purchased, which served routes in South America and inland. In 1985, a new distribution cargo terminal was opened in Sao Paulo, which was even adapted for storing perishable and dangerous goods.

In 1993, Varig transformed the division into a wholly subordinate company Varig Cargo. In August 1997, after the rebranding of the main company, the cargo company adopted its own corporate identity, in which its aircraft and cargo terminals were painted. At the same time, for the first time in Brazil, she created a website for tracking the movement of goods.

VarigLog

On 25 August 2000, Varig Cargo was transformed into a separate company Varig Logística or VarigLog for short. The airline started operations in September 2000. The new venture took over all cargo operations, a staff of 1,345 employees and a fleet of 11 cargo aircraft, 4 Boeing 727-100F, 4 Boeing 727-200F and 3 McDonnell Douglas DC-10-30F; At that time, Varig Logística was the largest cargo airline in the country, with distribution centers in Sao Paulo, Rio de Janeiro, Manaus, Porto Alegre, Miami, New York and Frankfurt.

Varig Log was purchased for US$48.2 million by the consortium Volo do Brasil in December 2005 during the split-up of the assets of Varig. Volo do Brasil comprised the MatlinPatterson Funds and the Brazilian investors Marcos Antonio Audi, Marcos Hapfel and Luiz Eduardo Gallo. The negotiation was concluded in June 2006, after strict regulatory approval, particularly concerned with the participation of foreign capital, limited by Brazilian laws to 20%.

In July 2006, Volo bought its one-time parent Varig (the "new" Varig, founded in 2005) but less than one year later Varig was divested from the Volo group, when on 28 March 2007 Gol Linhas Aéreas Inteligentes, the parent company of budget carrier Gol Transportes Aéreos, purchased Varig for US$320 million.

In March 2008, there were reports of asset transfers between Varig Log and Arrow Air as Arrow Air Cargo was also being absorbed into the MatlinPatterson holding company but they were not implemented.

Since March 2008, Varig Log has accumulated debts with both large and small suppliers which led to the request to be placed under bankruptcy protection on 3 March 2009. The Brazilian former investors accuse MatlinPatterson of mismanagement with the intention of leading Varig Log to bankruptcy. While VarigLog is protected, the legal battle continues.

The company is in "debtor-in-possession financing / receivership" at this time, and is under the direction of the successor organization to Volo, the Synergy Group. Published reports as of October 2009 are that the Synergy Group had acquired a controlling majority share holdings of Varig Logistica.

Between June 2007 and June 2009 Varig Log maintained an operational agreement with FedEx in Brazil.

Germán Efromovich (Synergy Group) gave up to buy the airline in 2011. On 3 February 2012, due to economic problems, it was forced to cease operations. On 27 September 2012, VarigLog was declared bankrupt and abolished.

Destinations

As of March 2011, VarigLog operated services to the following scheduled destinations:

Belém – Val de Cães International Airport
Brasília – Pres. Juscelino Kubitschek International Airport
Campinas – Viracopos International Airport
Fortaleza – Pinto Martins International Airport
Manaus – Eduardo Gomes International Airport
Recife – Guararapes/Gilberto Freyre International Airport
Salvador da Bahia – Deputado Luís Eduardo Magalhães International Airport
São Paulo – Guarulhos/Gov. André Franco Montoro International Airport

Fleet

Former fleet

As of December 2011 the fleet of VarigLog included the following aircraft:

Retired fleet
VarigLog had in the past operated a variety of aircraft, including:

Boeing 707-320C
Boeing 727-100C
Boeing 757-200SF
Cessna 208B Grand Caravan
Curtiss C-46 Commando
Dornier Do J Wal
Douglas C-47 Skytrain
Junkers F 13
Lockheed L-10A Electra
McDonnell Douglas DC-10-30F
McDonnell Douglas MD-11F

Accidents and incidents
On 11 June 1981, Varig Flight 967, a Boeing 707-320C (registered PP-VJT), when landing in Manaus in heavy rain and at an increased speed after touching, began to deviate to the right and crashed the right main landing gear into the light, as a result what the rack came off. The car crashed onto the concrete and skidded to a stop. All three crew members on board successfully evacuated, but the plane was critically damaged and was written off.
On 18 March 2002, a Boeing 727-100C (registered PP-VLV), was flying from Salvador to Belo Horizonte when it rolled off the runway during landing and was critically damaged. The crew of 3 were not injured.

See also
List of defunct airlines of Brazil

References

External links

Varig Logística (Archive)

Varig
Defunct airlines of Brazil
Latin American and Caribbean Air Transport Association
Defunct cargo airlines
Airlines established in 2000
Airlines disestablished in 2012